May Inlet is an Arctic waterway in Qikiqtaaluk Region, Nunavut, Canada. It is a natural bay in Sir William Parker Strait by northern Bathurst Island.

Geography
Notable landforms include: Grant Point to the west; Dundee Bight to the south; Palmer Point, Stuart Bay, and Purcell Bay to the east; and several unnamed islands within the bay. Helena Island is to the north, outside the bay's mouth.

Bays of Qikiqtaaluk Region